Ncincilili Titi (born 15 December 1993) is a South African sprinter who competes primarily in the 200 metres events. He finished fourth at the 2014 African Championships, as well as at the 2015 Summer Universiade. He won the gold medal at the 2018 African Championships.

His personal bests in the event are 20.41 seconds outdoors (Pretoria 2014) and 20.87 seconds indoors (Fayetteville 2015).

He studies Public Health at the University of South Carolina.
Ncincilili matriculated from Selborne College in East London.

Competition record

*Competed in heats only

Personal bests
Outdoor
100 metres – 10.17 (+ 1.1 m/s) (Knoxville, 2018)
200 metres – 20.00 (+1.9 m/s) (Columbia, SC, 2018)

Indoor
200 metres – 20.87 (Fayetteville 2015)

References

1993 births
Living people
South African male sprinters
Commonwealth Games competitors for South Africa
Athletes (track and field) at the 2014 Commonwealth Games
Competitors at the 2017 Summer Universiade
Competitors at the 2015 Summer Universiade
Medalists at the 2015 Summer Universiade
Universiade bronze medalists for South Africa
Universiade medalists in athletics (track and field)
African Championships in Athletics winners
South African expatriate sportspeople in the United Kingdom
South African expatriate sportspeople in the United States
South Carolina Gamecocks men's track and field athletes